Aik Din Geo Kay Sath is a Geo News television series, featuring interviews of politicians, film stars, musicians and athletes. It is hosted by Sohail Warraich.

Guests
Numerous celebrities and prominent personalities from all fields have been guests on this show including: Benazir Bhutto, Khan Abdul Wali Khan, Imran Khan, Asif Ali Zardari, 
Shehbaz Sharif, Sheikh Rasheed Ahmed, Asad Umar, Fawad Chaudhry, Altaf Hussain, Yasin Malik, Chaudhry Pervaiz Elahi, Yousaf Raza Gillani, Moin Qureshi, Maulana Abdul Aziz, Shahzad Roy, Akbar Bugti, Qazi Hussain Ahmed, Maulana Fazl-ur-Rehman, Ajmal Khattak, Zara Sheikh and Abrar Ul Haq Aamir Liaquat Hussain.

Format
The host and team start the show in the morning by meeting the guest. They go with the subject to his or her workplace and home, meeting their friends and relatives who are also invited to comment about the main guest personality of the show. This TV show also shows footage of everyday activities

References

External links
 

Geo News
Urdu-language television shows
Pakistani television series